Astrid van der Knaap (born 8 October 1964) is a Dutch badminton player, born in The Hague. She competed in women's singles at the 1992 Summer Olympics in Barcelona. She was four times the Dutch National Ladies Singles Champion in 1988, 1991, 1993 & 1994. She was runner-up at the World Grand Prix Dutch Open event in 1988. She won the Swiss Open twice in 1987 & 1992.

Achievements

Achievements with results

IBF World Grand Prix 
The World Badminton Grand Prix sanctioned by International Badminton Federation (IBF) since 1983.

Women's singles

IBF International Series 
Women's singles

References

External links

1964 births
Living people
Dutch female badminton players
Olympic badminton players of the Netherlands
Badminton players at the 1992 Summer Olympics
Sportspeople from The Hague
20th-century Dutch women